Eupsenius is a genus of ant-loving beetles in the family Staphylinidae. There are about six described species in Eupsenius.

Species
These six species belong to the genus Eupsenius:
 Eupsenius dilatatus Motschulsky, 1856
 Eupsenius glaber LeConte, 1849
 Eupsenius metasternalis Park
 Eupsenius nevermanni Park
 Eupsenius politus Reitter, 1883
 Eupsenius rectus Park

References

Further reading

 
 

Pselaphinae
Articles created by Qbugbot